Jakob Hlasek was the defending champion, but lost in the semifinals to seventh seed Jonas Svensson.Brad Gilbert won the title, defeating Jonas Svensson 6–1, 6–3, in the final.

Seeds

  Brad Gilbert (champion)
  Alberto Mancini (first round)
  Yannick Noah (first round)
  Carl-Uwe Steeb (second round)
  Magnus Gustafsson (quarterfinals)
  Jakob Hlasek (semifinals)
  Jonas Svensson (final)
  Amos Mansdorf (quarterfinals)

Draw

Finals

Top half

Bottom half

References
General

Specific

External links
 ITF tournament edition details

Singles
1990 ATP Tour